KDIL (940 AM) is a licensed radio station with an FCC-issued license for Jerome, Idaho, United States. The station began broadcasting in November 2010 under Program Test Authority from the FCC and was licensed on February 15, 2011.  The station broadcasts a Spanish adult hits format distributed by Orbital Media Networks.  The station is currently owned by Maria Rosario Ortega.

References

External links
 Official Website
 
 
 

DIL
Regional Mexican radio stations in the United States
Radio stations established in 2011
2011 establishments in Idaho